Uniontown High School may refer to:

 Uniontown Area High School, Uniontown, Pennsylvania
 Uniontown Jr/Sr High School, Uniontown USD 235, Uniontown, Kansas